Carter is an unincorporated community in the town of Wabeno in Forest County, Wisconsin, United States. WIS 32 travels north-south through the community.

History
A post office was established as Carter in 1897, and remained in operation until it was discontinued in 1955. The community was named for John Carpenter, a settler who built the first house.

Historic district
Minertown-Oneva, mining district

References

Unincorporated communities in Wisconsin
Unincorporated communities in Forest County, Wisconsin